The Sheriff of Wake County, North Carolina is responsible for law enforcement in the unincorporated areas of Wake County, North Carolina.  Sheriffs within the State of North Carolina are directly elected to four-year terms.  Prior to 1938, sheriffs were elected to two-year terms.  The Wake County Sheriff's Office is headquartered within the Wake County John H. Baker Jr. Public Safety Center in Raleigh, North Carolina.

Sheriffs of Wake County, North Carolina

Notes

References

Works cited 

General
 

Online sources
 
 
 
 
 
 
 
 
 
 
 
 
 
 
 
 
 
 
 
 
 
 
 
 
 
 
 
 
 
 
 
 
 
 
 
 
 
 
 
 
 
 
 
 
 
 
 
 
 
 
 
 
 
 
 
 
 
 
 
 
 
 
 
 
 
 
 
 
 
 
 
 
 
 
 
 
 
 
 
 
 
 
 
 
 
 
 
 
 
 
 
 
 
 
 
 
 
 
 
 
 
 
 
 
 
 
 
 
 
 
 
 
 
 
 
 
 

Law enforcement-related lists
Sheriffs
North Carolina-related lists